Avtomobili is a Slovenian and former Yugoslav new wave music group associated with pop and rock musical styles.

Avtomobili was formed in 1982 in Nova Gorica by brothers Marko and Mirko Vuksanović. In the 1980s they performed in the republics of the former Yugoslavia, mostly outside Slovenia. Initial songs were sung in Serbo-Croatian language. Avtomobili released twelve albums, one of which was a live album called Klub Klubov. Two were compilations: Drugi Svet and Največji zadetki. For a limited time, the group was the opening act for Zoran Predin.

Members

Original members

 Marko Vuksanović - lead vocalist, bass guitar
 Mirko Vuksanović - synthesizer, backing vocalist
 Roman Nussdorfer - guitar
 Valter Simončič - drums
 Mitja Mokrin - saxophone

Current members

 Marko Vuksanović - lead vocalist
 Mirko Vuksanović - synthesizer, backing vocalist
 Boštjan Andrejc "Bushy" - guitar, backing vocalist
 David Šuligoj - bass guitar
 David Morgan - drums, percussion

Past members

 Roman Nussdorfer - guitar
 Valter Simončič - drums
 Mitja Mokrin - saxophone
 Lucijan Kodermac - drums
 Alan Jakin - guitar
 Marko Lasič - drums
 Bor Zuljan - guitar in Tukaj v vasi

Discography

Studio albums

Live albums

Compilation albums

Prizes 
 1984 – Youth Festival in Subotica (first prize)
 1994 – Zlati Petelin
 1996 – Zlati Petelin

See also 
 New wave music in Yugoslavia

Links 
 
 

 

Musical groups established in 1982
People from Nova Gorica
Slovenian musical groups
Slovenian rock music groups
Slovenian pop music groups
Yugoslav rock music groups
Slovenian new wave musical groups
1982 establishments in Yugoslavia